The Future of Privacy Forum is a Washington DC based think tank and advocacy group focused on issues of data privacy. It is jointly supported by corporate sponsors and foundations.

Corporate members include AT&T, Comcast, Facebook, Google, Intelius and Microsoft, while foundation supporters include the Bill & Melinda Gates Foundation, Robert Wood Johnson Foundation, National Science Foundation, and Digital Trust Foundation.  The organization is run by Jules Polonetsky, the former chief privacy officer for AOL and Doubleclick. The founder and co-chair is Christopher Wolf, a lawyer who leads the privacy group at the law firm of Hogan Lovells. The advisory board includes representatives of LinkeIn, IAPP, Dell, Facebook, Microsoft, WalMart, ViacomCBS, T-Mobile, SAP, LiveRamp, Reddit, eBay or Uber.

In 2015, the Future of Privacy Forum announced Washington and Lee University School of Law as its academic partner.

Polonetsky is also on the advisory board of the Center for Copyright Information, the industry-run organization in charge of the "6 strikes" graduated response system for copyright infringement.

References

External links
 Future of Privacy Forum at fpf.org

Privacy organizations
Politics and technology
Privacy in the United States